The government in Moldova has in recent years taken several steps to fight corruption, including law enforcement and institutional setups. The prosecution of officials who are involved in corruption has also increased in recent years. However, businesses consider corruption a serious problem for doing business, and the business environment continues to be one of the most challenging in the region. 

According to Transparency International, 37% of Moldovans report paying a bribe in 2010. One of the most perceived corrupt institutions is the police.

A large anti-corruption protest was held in Chișinău in September 2015 following a $1 billion (£655 million) bank fraud.

On 19 April 2021, the Council of Europe Action Plan for the Republic of Moldova 2021–2024 was signed in Strasbourg, France. It is an action plan which, among other things, aims to combat corruption in the country.

On Transparency International's 2021 Corruption Perceptions Index, Moldova scored 36 on a scale from 0 ("highly corrupt") to 100 ("highly clean"). When ranked by score, Moldova ranked 105th among the 180 countries in the Index, where the country ranked first is perceived to have the most honest public sector.  For comparison, the best score was 88 (ranked 1), and the worst score was 11 (ranked 180).

See also 
 Crime in Moldova

References

External links
Moldova Corruption Profile from the Business Anti-Corruption Portal

Moldova
Government of Moldova
Crime in Moldova by type
Politics of Moldova